Mikhail Nikolayevich Tikhomirov (31 May 1893 — 2 September 1965) was a leading Soviet specialist in medieval Russian paleography.

Tikhomirov was born and spent his whole life in Moscow, where he was in charge of the Archaeographic Commission of the Academy of Sciences of the USSR (to which he was elected a corresponding member in 1946 and full member in 1953). He was responsible for the Soviet edition of the Full Collection of Russian Chronicles and edited collections of many other medieval documents, including the Russkaya Pravda and Sobornoye Ulozhenie.

His major works include A Study of Russkaya Pravda (1941), Old Russian Cities (1956, 2nd ed.), Medieval Moscow (1957), Russia in the Sixteenth Century (1962), Russian Culture from the Tenth to the Eighteenth Century (1968), The Russian State from the Fourteenth to the Seventeenth Century (1973), and Ancient Rus (1975).

References
Content of this page in part derives from the Great Soviet Encyclopedia article on the same subject.

1893 births
1965 deaths
Writers from Moscow
People from Moskovsky Uyezd
Soviet historians
Russian palaeographers
Moscow State University alumni
Full Members of the USSR Academy of Sciences
Members of the Polish Academy of Sciences
Recipients of the Order of Lenin
Recipients of the Order of the Red Banner of Labour
Burials at Novodevichy Cemetery